The Gravel Hill Baptist Church was a historic church on Gravel Hill Road in rural western White County, Arkansas, United States of America.  It was located on Gravel Hill Road in the community of Gravel Hill, south of County Road 26 and west of Searcy.   It was a single-story fieldstone structure, built in the Rustic or National Park style.  It had a front-facing gable roof, with exposed rafter ends in the Craftsman style, and had a gable roofed entrance porch.  The church was built in 1935, and was the only building of its type in the area.

The building was listed on the National Register of Historic Places in 1992.  It has been listed as destroyed in the Arkansas Historic Preservation Program database.

See also
National Register of Historic Places listings in White County, Arkansas

References

Baptist churches in Arkansas
Churches on the National Register of Historic Places in Arkansas
Churches completed in 1935
Churches in White County, Arkansas
National Register of Historic Places in White County, Arkansas